Mir Mirak Andrabi (921-990 AH; c. 1515–1582 AD) was a Sufi scholar in Kashmir. The son of Shams-ud-din Andrabi (860-932 AH, c. 1455–1525), his great-grandfather Ahmad Andrabi was originally from Andarab, a valley in southern Baghlan Province in northeastern Afghanistan. He migrated with his clan to Kashmir to spread Islam. His descendants are known as Andrabi Syed; their temple is Khanqah-e-Andrabia located at Malaratta, Srinagar.

References

Further reading 
 Ahmad, Syed. Tohfa Syed. Mss.3- 4-5.Research library Damsaz Ali University of Kashmir.
 Gamgeen, S.S. 1983. Genealogical history of Andrabi Syeds. Srinagar
 Sabur Ahmad Ibni.Khawariqus Salikeen. Mss.102-03. Research library Kashmir University
 Kamal Mir, Inshai Mir Kamal, Mss, 50, Research library University of Kashmir.
 
 Zikir Sadaat-i-Andrabia by Moulana Nabeeh Ahmad Andrabi "Shaheed".
 Tareekh-i-Bab-i-Sulaiman by Mir Saad-ul-lah Shahabadi

Indian Sunni Muslim scholars of Islam
Kashmiri people
1510s births
1580s deaths